Chaloner is an example of de Winton's distinctive vertical-boilered design, as used for many years in the North Wales slate quarries. It was built in 1877 at the Union Works in Caernarfon. (The former de Winton factory is located across the road from the present WHR station).

Industrial use 

Chaloner was supplied new to the Pen-y-Bryn slate quarry, Nantlle. Unusually for a de Winton locomotive, it was supplied with an overall cab.

In 1888, it was sold to the nearby Pen-yr-Orsedd Quarry. Penyrorsedd leased the Penybryn tipping tramway in 1890, so for a while Chaloner may have continued to run on its original line.  where it ran until about 1950. It was then withdrawn and stored in a locomotive shed with Kerr Stuart Diana.

Preservation  

In 1960, Chaloner was purchased by Alfred Fisher, who restored it to working order.

Leighton Buzzard Light Railway 

The locomotive was used to haul the opening train of the 'Iron Horse Railroad' at Leighton Buzzard in 1968. The railway later became the Leighton Buzzard Light Railway. Though in poor condition it hauled trains there for several years until replaced by more powerful locomotives needed for longer trains. It was housed at the National Railway Museum in York from 1977 until 1983. 

Chaloner has received a new boiler fitted at Boston Lodge Works but apart from that is composed of entirely original material, making it unique among mid-Victorian locomotives. The newest part is the water tank which originated on a locomotive called 'Victoria' and dates from 1897. It has been successively improved since preservation. In 2011 it worked a train of two slate wagons and members from Caernarfon (opposite the works where it was built) to Porthmadog on the Welsh Highland Railway a distance of twenty five miles achieving speeds over well over 20 m.p.h. on the flat. A week later it worked to Blaenau Ffestiniog and back with slate wagons. Replacement of valves of the correct size and other adjustments since then have seen further improvements to performance affecting economy.

During its display in the old de Winton works in Caernarfon a works photograph was discovered showing the engine as-built with its cab. A replica cab was built and fitted, but it made conditions difficult for operating and it was removed and placed in store after two years.

Chaloner remains based at Leighton Buzzard.

Visiting other railways 
Chaloner was a visitor to the Ffestiniog Railway for the 150th Anniversary Celebrations in 1986. It returned in October 1986 for an overhaul at Boston Lodge, including fitting of a new boiler.  Another of a number of visits was the Festival of Steam Gala, May 1997.

It visited the Welsh Highland Railway (Porthmadog) around 1989 and 1998, and in 2006 visited the Welsh Highland Railway (Caernarfon). Other visits were made in 2011 and 2019.

She has visited 24 other railways, including some in France, Germany and Belgium.

References 

Preserved narrow gauge steam locomotives of Great Britain
Individual locomotives of Great Britain